Choeras is a genus of braconid wasps in the family Braconidae. There are at least 80 described species in Choeras, found worldwide.

Species
These 80 species belong to the genus Choeras:

 Choeras achterbergi Narendran, 1998
 Choeras adjunctus (Nees, 1834)
 Choeras afrotropicalis Fernandez-Triana & van Achterberg, 2017
 Choeras almus (Tobias & Kotenko, 1984)
 Choeras angustus Song & Chen, 2014
 Choeras aper (Nixon, 1965)
 Choeras apo (Wilkinson, 1929)
 Choeras apollion (Nixon, 1965)
 Choeras arene (Nixon, 1973)
 Choeras avus (Tobias & Kotenko, 1984)
 Choeras batrachedrae (Kotenko, 1992)
 Choeras botydis (Wilkinson, 1930)
 Choeras brevinervus Song & Chen, 2014
 Choeras bushblitz Fagan-Jeffries & Austin, 2019
 Choeras calacte (Nixon, 1965)
 Choeras ceto (Nixon, 1965)
 Choeras ciscaucasicus (Tobias, 1971)
 Choeras compressifemur Chen & Song, 2004
 Choeras consimilis (Viereck, 1911)
 Choeras daphne (Nixon, 1965)
 Choeras dissors (Nixon, 1965)
 Choeras dorsalis (Spinola, 1808)
 Choeras epaphus (Nixon, 1965)
 Choeras flavicorpus Song & Chen, 2014
 Choeras fomes (Nixon, 1965)
 Choeras formosus Abdoli & Fernandez-Triana, 2019
 Choeras fujianensis Song & Chen, 2014
 Choeras fulviventris Fernandez-Triana & Abdoli, 2019
 Choeras gerontius (Nixon, 1965)
 Choeras gielisi van Achterberg, 2002
 Choeras gnarus (Tobias & Kotenko, 1984)
 Choeras grammatitergitus Song & Chen, 2014
 Choeras helespas Walker, 1996
 Choeras helle (Nixon, 1965)
 Choeras infirmicarinatus Song & Chen, 2014
 Choeras insignis (Muesebeck, 1938)
 Choeras irates (Nixon, 1965)
 Choeras koalascatocola Fagan-Jeffries & Austin, 2017
 Choeras libanius (Nixon, 1965)
 Choeras longiterebrus (Rao & Chalikwar, 1976)
 Choeras longitergitus Song & Chen, 2014
 Choeras longus Song & Chen, 2014
 Choeras loretta (Nixon, 1965)
 Choeras morialta Fagan-Jeffries & Austin, 2017
 Choeras nephta (Nixon, 1965)
 Choeras papua (Wilkinson, 1936)
 Choeras parabolus Kotenko, 2007
 Choeras parasitellae (Bouché, 1834)
 Choeras parasonium Kotenko, 2007
 Choeras parviocellus Song & Chen, 2014
 Choeras parvoculus Fagan-Jeffries & Austin, 2019
 Choeras psarae (Wilkinson, 1927)
 Choeras qazviniensis Fernandez-Triana & Talebi, 2019
 Choeras recusans (Walker, 1860)
 Choeras ruficornis (Nees, 1834)
 Choeras rugulosus Song & Chen, 2014
 Choeras semele (Nixon, 1965)
 Choeras semilunatus Song & Chen, 2014
 Choeras semirugosus Song & Chen, 2014
 Choeras sordidus (Ashmead, 1900)
 Choeras stenoterga (de Saeger, 1944)
 Choeras superbus (de Saeger, 1944)
 Choeras sylleptae (de Saeger, 1942)
 Choeras taftanensis Ghafouri Moghaddam & van Achterberg, 2018
 Choeras takeuchii (Watanabe, 1937)
 Choeras tarasi Kotenko, 2007
 Choeras tedellae (Nixon, 1961)
 Choeras tegularis (Szépligeti, 1905)
 Choeras tenuialatus Song & Chen, 2014
 Choeras tiro (Reinhard, 1880)
 Choeras tumidus Song & Chen, 2014
 Choeras vacillatrix (Wilkinson, 1930)
 Choeras vacillatropsis (de Saeger, 1944)
 Choeras validicarinatus Song & Chen, 2014
 Choeras validus (Thomson, 1895)
 Choeras varicolor Song & Chen, 2014
 Choeras venilia (Nixon, 1965)
 Choeras yunnanensis Song & Chen, 2014
 Choeras zerovae Kotenko, 2007
 Choeras zygon Fagan-Jeffries & Austin, 2019

References

Further reading

 
 
 

Microgastrinae
Braconidae genera